Detective  is a 1954 Argentine film directed by Carlos Schlieper.

Cast
 Pablo Palitos
 Fada Santoro
 Susana Campos
 Felisa Mary
 Héctor Méndez
 Egle Martin
 Tangolele
 Carlos Enríquez
 Irma Atoche
 Nina Marqui
 Guillermo Brizuela Méndez
 Osvaldo Nícora
 Julio Portela
 Emma Gardina
 Alba Varela
 Esther Kell
 Graciela Herrero
 Renée Roxana

References

External links 
 

1954 films
1950s Spanish-language films
Argentine black-and-white films
Films directed by Carlos Schlieper
Argentine drama films
1954 drama films
1950s Argentine films